Anatoly Lomachenko (born 14 December 1964) is a Ukrainian boxing trainer. He is the father of three-division boxing champion Vasiliy Lomachenko. He was selected to receive the Futch–Condon Award for the 2017 Trainer of the Year by the Boxing Writers Association of America (BWAA) and 2018 by the Ring magazine.

External links
 Anatoly Lomachenko, his trainer and father, was voted the Trainer of the Year
 Aleksandr Usyk named Ring Magazine Fighter of the Year 2018, all ...
 Anatoly Lomachenko BoxRec

Living people
Boxing trainers
1964 births